John Allan Kingston (born 7 July 1935) is an Australian politician. He was a member of the Legislative Assembly of Queensland from 1998 to 2003, representing the electorate of Maryborough.

Kingston was born in Brisbane. He first came to state parliament one of the 11 One Nation candidates elected at the 1998 state election. However, Kingston broke with his party less than a year later and sat as an independent from February 1999. He was re-elected at the 2001 state election before resigning midway through his term in March 2003 citing poor health.

Prior to entering state politics, Kingston was a Maryborough City councillor. He is married to wife Pahninh Silasack with whom he has three adopted children.

References

1935 births
Living people
One Nation members of the Parliament of Queensland
Independent members of the Parliament of Queensland
Members of the Queensland Legislative Assembly
Politicians from Brisbane
People from Maryborough, Queensland
21st-century Australian politicians